Kurban Bekiyevich Berdyev (born 25 August 1952) is a Turkmen-Russian football manager, and a former Soviet footballer. He is the manager of Russian club Sochi. In 2017 he was shown among top 50 managers in the world by fourfourtwo.com, at the 36th place, ahead of Brendan Rodgers.

Career

Playing career
Berdyev grew up with Kolhozçy Aşgabat where he played in cadet and junior teams since 1966. He joined the professional team in 1971.
Soviet Top League (7 seasons, 155 games, 23 goals) – FC Kairat (1977, 1981, 1982, 1984, 1985), FC SKA Rostov-on-Don (1979, 1980). Highest place- 8th with Kairat (1977, 1984).
Soviet First League (7 seasons, 211 games, 32 goals) – Kolhozçy Aşgabat (1971, 1972, 1973, 1974, 1976, 1978), FC Kairat (1983), First League Winner with FC Kairat in 1983.
Soviet Second League (2 seasons) – Kolhozçy Aşgabat (1975), FC Rostov (1980).

Coaching career
It was in Rubin Kazan where Berdyev made his name as a coach getting the team promoted to Russian Premier League in 2002, and grabbing the bronze medals there in their debut year (2003).

All the highest-tier titles of Rubin were won with Berdyev as a manager: these were Russian Premier League titles in 2008 and 2009, Russian Cup in 2011–12 and Russian Super Cup in 2010 and 2012.

Berdyev was fired from Rubin on 20 December 2013 and a year later, on 18 December 2014, was appointed as a manager of FC Rostov. In the end of 2014-15 season, Rostov stayed up in the Russian Premier League by winning the relegation play-offs. In the 2015–16 season, Rostov unexpectedly qualified the Champions League spot, taking the 2nd spot in the league. Berdyev resigned from Rostov on 6 August 2016. On 9 September 2016, he returned to FC Rostov to the position of vice-president/coach. On 1 June 2017, he left FC Rostov once more.

On 9 June 2017, he returned to FC Rubin Kazan. On 5 June 2019, he left Rubin once again.

On 24 August 2021, Berdyev was appointed manager of the Kazakhstan Premier League club FC Kairat. Berdyev left Kairat by mutual consent on 6 June 2022.

On 20 June 2022, Berdyev was hired by Tractor in Iran.

On 25 December 2022, Berdyev was hired by Russian Premier League club Sochi.

Managerial statistics

Managerial honours

Nisa
Ýokary Liga: 1998–99
Turkmenistan Cup: 1998

Rubin
Russian Premier League: 2008, 2009
Russian Cup: 2011–12
Russian Super Cup: 2010, 2012
Russian First Division: 2002

Rostov
Russian Premier League runner-up: 2015–16

Kairat
Kazakhstan Cup : 2021

Individual
Russian Football Union Best Coach: 2009

Highest advances in the continental club competitions
Asian Cup Winners' Cup – 2nd round (1998–1999)
UEFA Champions League – 3rd place in the Group stage (2009–2010), (2010–2011), (2016–2017);
UEFA Europa League – Quarterfinals (2012–2013)

Personal life

Berdyev always carries his pray beads with him. He never appears without them.

Education – Ashgabat Railroads Vocational School (1967–71), Turkmen State University (1971–1975), Moscow Higher Coaching School (1989–1991). In the Soviet Army 1979 - 80, first lieutenant.

Berdyev is known as a very introverted person.

Wife Roza Berdyeva. Berdyev has two sons and a daughter. The eldest son from his first marriage Marat Berdyyev (born 23.09.1975) is a British actor, musician and producer. Junior Alaberdy Berdyev (born 5.8.1996) - schoolboy, plays football in the "FC Rubin Kazan" youth academy. Daughter Aylar — a student. Kurban Berdyev's brother is Batyr Berdyev (born 1956), a coach of football club Fenix, Ashgabat. Another brother, Murad Berdyev (born 1954), died in 2003.

In 2012, he was decorated by the Russian Federation with the Order of Friendship Medal.

He holds Russian citizenship.

References

External links

 Profile at FC Rubin Kazan site 

1952 births
Living people
Sportspeople from Ashgabat
Turkmenistan footballers
Turkmenistan football managers
Turkmenistan expatriate football managers
Soviet footballers
Soviet football managers
Russian footballers
Russian football managers
Russian expatriate football managers
Russian people of Turkmenistan descent
Soviet Top League players
Soviet First League players
FC Kairat players
FC SKA Rostov-on-Don players
FC Rostov players
Gençlerbirliği S.K. managers
Expatriate football managers in Kazakhstan
FC Kairat managers
FC Taraz managers
FC Rubin Kazan managers
Russian Premier League managers
FC Rostov managers
Expatriate football managers in Turkey
FC Nisa Aşgabat managers
Turkmenistan national football team managers
Tractor S.C. managers
PFC Sochi managers
Persian Gulf Pro League managers
Expatriate football managers in Iran
Turkmenistan expatriate sportspeople in Iran
Russian Muslims
Turkmenistan Muslims
Turkmenistan emigrants to Russia
Naturalised citizens of Russia
Association football midfielders
Turkmen State University alumni